Jaroslav Borák (born 9 November 1989 in Brno) is a Czech football player who currently plays for 1. FC Brno. He started his football career with FC Dosta Bystrc-Kníničky, but has been playing for 1. FC Brno since the age of eight. He joined the first team in January 2008. In the season 2008/09 he has played 89 minutes in 5 matches in Gambrinus liga.

External links
 

1989 births
Living people
Czech footballers
Czech First League players
FC Zbrojovka Brno players
Footballers from Brno

Association football midfielders